Anton Lončar (born 15 January 1996) is a Croatian swimmer. In 2019 he competed in the men's 100 metre backstroke and men's 200 metre backstroke events at the 2019 World Aquatics Championships, Held in Gwangju, South Korea. He placed 35th in the 100m and 23rd in the 200m. 

He also competed in the men's 100 metre backstroke and men's 200 metre backstroke events at the 2018 FINA World Swimming Championships (25 m), in Hangzhou, China. Lončar placed 16th in the 100m, setting the national record of 51.09 s in the process, and placed 13th in the 200m in a time of 1:51.79.

Lončar also competed in the 2017 World Aquatics Championships in Budapest, Hungary, and in the 2016 FINA World Swimming Championships (25 m) in Windsor, Ontario, in the 100m and 200m backstroke events. In the 2017 European Short Course Swimming Championships Lončar placed 5th in the final of the 200m backstroke.

References

External links
 

1996 births
Living people
Croatian male swimmers
Male backstroke swimmers
Swimmers from Portland, Oregon
20th-century Croatian people
21st-century Croatian people
Denver Pioneers athletes
Mediterranean Games competitors for Croatia
Swimmers at the 2018 Mediterranean Games